Stratford Central Secondary School was a public high school and middle school in Stratford, Ontario, Canada.

In 2020, the school was renamed Stratford Intermediate School, and became a school for grades 7 and 8.  Secondary students from the former school were moved to Stratford Northwestern Secondary School, which was renamed Stratford District Secondary School.

Extracurricular Activities

Clubs
Stratford Central at closing had 18 different clubs, associations, and councils.

Music Ensembles
Stratford Central had numerous music ensembles, including:
 Symphonic Band (Grade 10-12)
 Concert Band (Grade 9)
 Jazz Band (Grade 11-12)
 Central singers (School choir)
 Guitar Ensemble
 Rams Horns (Brass Quintet)
 Marching Band

Notable alumni
Princess Basmah Bani Ahmad, royal princess of Jordan
Graham Abbey, actor
James Reaney, poet and playwright
Stanley Stewart, writer
Lloyd Robertson, news anchor

See also
List of high schools in Ontario

References

High schools in Stratford, Ontario
Educational institutions established in 1844
1844 establishments in Canada